Nine Mile Creek is a stream in Hennepin County, Minnesota, in the United States. It is a tributary of the Minnesota River.

See also
List of rivers of Minnesota

References

Rivers of Hennepin County, Minnesota
Rivers of Minnesota